The 2017 World Cup Taekwondo Team Championships was the 9th edition of the World Cup Taekwondo Team Championships, and was held in Abidjan, Ivory Coast from December 5 to December 6, 2017.

Teams were allowed to augment their squads with maximum two athletes from other countries.

Medalists

 Foreign athletes are shown in italic.

Men

Preliminary round

Group A

Group B

Knockout round

Women

Preliminary round

Final

Mixed

References

External links
Official website 

World Cup
World Cup Taekwondo Team Championships
Taekwondo Championships
Taekwondo